Malancha railway station is located in Dakshin Dinajpur district in the Indian state of West Bengal. It serves Malancha, Fulbari village and the surrounding areas. Malancha station was built in 2004. A few trains, like the Gour Express, Malda Town–Balurghat passenger trains stop at Malancha railway station.

References

Railway stations in Dakshin Dinajpur district
Railway stations opened in 2004
Katihar railway division
Gangarampur